Thomas Gaardsøe Christensen (born 23 November 1979) is a Danish former professional footballer.

Gaardsøe most notably won the 1999 Danish Superliga with Aalborg Boldspilklub, and played abroad for English clubs Ipswich Town and West Bromwich Albion. He played two matches and scored a single goal for the Danish national team.

Club career

Early career
Son of former Randers Freja player Per Gaardsøe, Thomas Gaardsøe played his youth football at Freja. His name first caught the headlines when he was a part of the winning team in the 1994 and 1995 editions of the Danish nationwide school football tournament, scoring in both finals.

AaB
He moved to Aalborg Boldspilklub (AaB) in the Danish Superliga championship, and made his senior debut in June 1997. Despite occasional good performances, he had a hard time forcing his way into the AaB starting line-up in his role as central midfielder. He made his AaB breakthrough in spring 2001, as a replacement for the injured central defender Torben Boye. He impressed in his new role at AaB, as he was once more called up for the under-21 national team.

Ipswich Town
In the summer 2001, he was sold to English club Ipswich Town in the FA Premier League championship in a transfer deal worth £1.3 million. He did not play much in his first season, but managed to score his first goal for Ipswich against Sunderland in December 2001. After his first season at the club, Ipswich suffered relegation into the English First Division. In the First Division, Gaardsøe became an important member for the squad, scoring six goals in all competitions of the 2002–2003 season.

West Bromwich Albion
He was sold in the summer of 2003, to First Division rivals West Bromwich Albion, and his first appearance came in a 4–0 thrashing of Brentford in the Football League Cup in August 2003. He scored his first goal for Albion in a 4–1 victory over his former club Ipswich, on 13 September 2003 and went on to be an ever-present in Albion's promotion winning team. He was named "Player of the Year" by the supporters who, in turn, dressed up as Vikings in his honour for the away match at Reading on 1 May 2004.

Most of Gaardsøe's 2005–2006 season was hampered by a serious groin injury, which originated in a pre-match warm-up before an April 2005 game against Manchester United. He only played seven league games in a season which ended in Albion's relegation to the First Division. In the beginning of the 2006–2007 season, the continued injury problems made him consider a premature retirement from football. On 19 December 2006 Gaardsøe announced his retirement from the game, having been unable to regain full fitness from the groin operation in the summer.

Return to football
Two and a half year later he returned to football after having fully recovered from his injury. This time he signed for his childhood club Aalborg BK. However, Gaardsøe has not succeeded in establishing himself in the AaB squad and in order to find regular first team football, he has signed a contract with Danish superliga rivals Esbjerg from January 2010.

After his contract ended with Esbjerg fB in the summer of 2012, he searched for a new club. After two months, on 29 August 2012, Gaardsøe retired from football, being unable to find a new club.

International career
Gaardsøe gained his first international experience in 1998, playing two games for the Danish under-19 national team. He also won 10 caps for the Danish under-21 national team between 1998 and 2001, scoring once.

He won his first international cap in November 2003, coming on as a substitute in Denmark's 3–2 victory over England. He scored his first national team goal in his second match, a 5–1 win against Poland in August 2004.

Career statistics

International
Source:

International goals
Denmark score listed first, score column indicates score after each Gaardsøe goal.

Honours
AaB
Danish Superliga: 1998–99

West Bromwich Albion
Football League First Division runner-up: 2003–04

Individual
West Bromwich Albion Player of the Year: 2003–04

References

External links
Danish national team profile
 AaB profile
 Official Danish Superliga stats

1979 births
Living people
Danish men's footballers
Association football central defenders
Denmark youth international footballers
Denmark under-21 international footballers
Denmark international footballers
AaB Fodbold players
Ipswich Town F.C. players
West Bromwich Albion F.C. players
Esbjerg fB players
Danish Superliga players
Premier League players
English Football League players
Danish expatriate men's footballers
Expatriate footballers in England
Danish expatriate sportspeople in England